Vagner Rocha (born June 6, 1982 in Rio de Janeiro, Brazil) is a Brazilian-American Brazilian Jiu-Jitsu practitioner and professional mixed martial artist, currently competing in the lightweight division.

He is the current Combat Jiu-Jitsu Worlds lightweight champion.

Mixed martial arts career
Primarily known for his expertise in Brazilian jiu-jitsu, Rocha began his MMA career in 2009. In addition to regional promotions in his adopted state of Florida, Rocha has competed for Bellator and Strikeforce.

Ultimate Fighting Championship
Vagner made his UFC debut on June 11, 2011 against Donald Cerrone at UFC 131, replacing an injured Mac Danzig.  Cerrone dominated Rocha by utilizing leg kicks, Rocha lost via unanimous decision.

In his second UFC bout Rocha defeated Ultimate Fighter 14 alumni Cody McKenzie on September 17, 2011 at UFC Fight Night 25 by submission due to a rear naked choke in the second round.

Rocha was expected to make his featherweight debut against Mike Brown on January 15, 2012 at UFC on FX 1.  However, Brown was forced from the bout with an injury. Rocha instead made his featherweight debut against Jonathan Brookins on February 15, 2012 at UFC on Fuel TV 1.  He lost the fight via KO in the first round. After the loss to Brookins, Rocha was subsequently released from the promotion.

Fight Time Promotions
Rocha faced Mike Bruno on November 2, 2012 at Fight Time 12. Rocha won the fight by submission due to a triangle choke in the second round.

Rocha faced Kamrin Naville on February 15, 2013 at Fight Time 13. Rocha won the fight by unanimous decision.

Rocha faced J. P. Reese on April 26, 2013 at Fight Time 14. Rocha won the fight by submission in the fifth round.

Rocha faced journeyman Randy Barroso on August 23, 2013 at Fight Time 16. Rocha won the fight by submission in the first round.

Return to UFC
On April 20, 2014, it was announced that Rocha would return at UFC 172 to replace Yancy Medeiros, who shifted in the card to face Jim Miller, against Joe Ellenberger. However, Rocha suffered a last-minute training injury and the bout was removed from the card.

Rocha faced Jake Matthews on November 8, 2014 at UFC Fight Night 55. He lost the fight due to technical submission in the second round.

Rocha was expected to face promotional newcomer Joseph Duffy on March 14, 2015 at UFC 185.  However, Rocha pulled out of the bout in early February citing injury and was replaced by Jake Lindsey. Rocha was subsequently released from the promotion.

Professional grappling career
Rocha competed against Xande Ribeiro in a superfight at BJJ Bet on September 6, 2020 and the pair fought to a draw. He then fought Gabriel Almeida in the co-main event of Fight 2 Win 157 on November 14, 2020, submitting him with an inside heelhook and earning 'Submission of the Night'. For his final match of the year, he was booked against Jon 'Thor' Blank at Who's Number One on December 11, 2020. In the end, Rocha won by split decision.

On January 16, 2021 Rocha was scheduled to face William Tackett in the main event of Fight 2 Win 160, but had to withdraw due to undisclosed reasons. He returned to competition on February 19, 2021 in the main event of Fight 2 Win 164 against Yuri Simões and defeated him by decision. He was then scheduled to compete against Gordon Ryan in the main event of Who's Number One on March 26, 2021. Rocha lost the match by submission, tapping to a triangle choke. He returned to Who's Number One on May 28, 2021 to face Josh Hinger and won a decision against him.

Rocha received an invite to compete at the 2022 ADCC World Championship as a result of his silver medal in 2019. Rocha went 3-1 at the event and won a bronze medal in the 88kg division. On December 4, 2022, Rocha fought in a Combat Jiu-Jitsu superfight against Ty Freeman at Subversiv 8, submitting him with a rear-naked choke.

Rocha was handed a three-year suspension from IBJJF competition by USADA as a result of refusing to submit a sample for testing on December 23, 2022.

Titles and accomplishments
Fight Time Promotions
Fight Time Lightweight Championship (Two times)
ISKA Lightweight Championship (One time)

Combat Jiu Jitsu Worlds
 Combat Jiu Jitsu World Championship - Lightweight (Current)

ADCC
 Bronze medal at 88kg (2022)
 Best match at 2022 ADCC World Championship (2022)

Personal life
He is married, has 2 children, and currently resides in Pembroke Pines, Florida where he teaches Brazilian Jiu-Jitsu at Vagner Rocha Martial Arts.

Both Rocha's son Achilles and his daughter Jasmine train under him and both are frequent competitors despite their youth. Jasmine is a black belt in BJJ & his son Achilles is a blue belt.

Mixed martial arts record

|-
| Win
|align=center| 14–4
| Yoislandy Izquierdo
| Decision (unanimous)
| Fight Time 35: A New Era
| 
|align=center| 5
|align=center| 5:00
|Miami, Florida, United States
|
|-
| Win
|align=center| 13–4
| Rafael da Silva Alves
| TKO (leg kicks)
| Fight Time 32
| 
|align=center| 3
|align=center| 2:36
|Fort Lauderdale, Florida, United States
|
|-
| Win
|align=center| 12–4
| Gabriel Miranda
| TKO (punches)
| Fight Time 30
| 
|align=center| 1
|align=center| 4:35
|Fort Lauderdale, Florida, United States
|
|-
| Loss
|align=center| 11–4
| Jake Matthews
| Technical Submission (rear-naked choke)
| UFC Fight Night: Rockhold vs. Bisping
| 
|align=center| 2
|align=center| 1:52
|Sydney, Australia
|
|-
| Win
|align=center| 11–3
| Randy Barroso
| Submission (triangle choke)
| Fight Time 16: Rocha vs. Barroso
| 
|align=center| 1
|align=center| 3:09
|Fort Lauderdale, Florida, United States
|
|-
| Win
|align=center| 10–3
| J. P. Reese
| Submission (rear-naked choke)
| Fight Time 14: This Means War! 
| 
|align=center| 5
|align=center| 2:18
|Fort Lauderdale, Florida, United States
|
|-
| Win
|align=center| 9–3
| Kamrin Naville
| Decision (unanimous)
| Fight Time 13: MMA Kings
| 
|align=center| 3
|align=center| 5:00
|Fort Lauderdale, Florida, United States
|
|-
| Win
|align=center| 8–3
| Mike Bruno
| Submission (triangle choke)
| Fight Time 12: Warriors Collide
| 
|align=center| 2
|align=center| 0:53
|Fort Lauderdale, Florida, United States
|
|-
| Loss
|align=center| 7–3
| Jonathan Brookins
| KO (punches)
| UFC on Fuel TV: Sanchez vs. Ellenberger
| 
|align=center| 1
|align=center| 1:32
|Omaha, Nebraska, United States
|
|-
| Win
|align=center| 7–2
| Cody McKenzie
| Submission (rear-naked choke)
| UFC Fight Night: Shields vs. Ellenberger
| 
|align=center| 2
|align=center| 3:49
|New Orleans, Louisiana, United States
| 
|-
| Loss
|align=center| 6–2
| Donald Cerrone
| Decision (unanimous)
| UFC 131
| 
|align=center| 3
|align=center| 5:00
|Vancouver, British Columbia, Canada
| 
|-
| Win
|align=center| 6–1
| Jacob Clark
| Submission (armbar)
| MFA: New Generation 5
| 
|align=center| 1
|align=center| 2:32
|Miami, Florida, United States
| 
|-
| Loss
|align=center| 5–1 
| Bret Bergmark
| Decision (unanimous)
| Strikeforce: Fedor vs. Werdum
| 
|align=center| 3
|align=center| 5:00
|San Jose, California, United States
| 
|-
| Win
|align=center| 5–0
| Francisco Soares
| TKO (punches)
| Bellator 13
| 
|align=center| 2
|align=center| 2:07
|Hollywood, Florida, United States
| 
|-
| Win
|align=center| 4–0
| Patrick Mikesz
| Submission (armbar)
| Action Fight League: Rock-N-Rumble 2
| 
|align=center| 1
|align=center| 2:10
|Hollywood, Florida, United States
| 
|-
| Win
|align=center| 3–0
| Renato Puente
| Submission (armbar)
| NDC 1: Peru vs. American Top Team
| 
|align=center| 1
|align=center| 1:06
|Lima, Peru
| 
|-
| Win
|align=center| 2–0
| Igor Gracie
| Decision (unanimous)
| Bellator 11
| 
|align=center| 3
|align=center| 5:00
|Uncasville, Connecticut, United States
| 
|-
| Win
|align=center| 1–0
| Alan Arzeno
| Submission (rear-naked choke)
| XCF: Rumble in Racetown 1
| 
|align=center| 1
|align=center| 0:42
|Daytona Beach, Florida, United States
|

See also
 List of male mixed martial artists

References

External links

1982 births
Living people
Brazilian male mixed martial artists
American male mixed martial artists
Welterweight mixed martial artists
Lightweight mixed martial artists
Featherweight mixed martial artists
Mixed martial artists utilizing Brazilian jiu-jitsu
People from Pembroke Pines, Florida
Brazilian practitioners of Brazilian jiu-jitsu
American practitioners of Brazilian jiu-jitsu
People awarded a black belt in Brazilian jiu-jitsu
Brazilian emigrants to the United States
Ultimate Fighting Championship male fighters